Saak Albertovich Karapetyan (28 March 1960 – 3 October 2018) was a Russian deputy attorney general of Armenian descent. He was killed in a helicopter crash in October 2018 at age 58.

Biography 

From 1983 to 1996, Karapetyan was in various positions as a prosecutor of the Rostov region: he started as an intern, reached the head of the department for supervision of the investigation of particularly important cases and operational investigative activities. From 1996 to 2000, he was a State Duma deputy from the Yabloko party, deputy chairman of the security committee.

Death

Karapetyan died when a Eurocopter AS350 Écureuil crashed in Kostroma.

References

Victims of aviation accidents or incidents in Russia
1960 births
2018 deaths
Russian lawyers
United Russia politicians
Russian people of Armenian descent
People from Rostov Oblast
Second convocation members of the State Duma (Russian Federation)
Yabloko politicians
Recipients of the Order of Honour (Russia)
Southern Federal University alumni